The Moderne is a 30-story apartment building in Milwaukee. The tower's ground floor is occupied by Carson's Ribs, with the remaining floors used for apartments, condominiums, and parking.

History
The building was started in 2011 during the Great Recession following the securing of loans from the City of Milwaukee and the United States Department of Housing and Urban Development. The Moderne remains the tallest building to have ever been constructed west of the Milwaukee River in the State of Wisconsin.

Design and Construction
The Moderne was developed by Barrett Lo Visionary Development with RINKA serving as lead architect and J.H. Findorff as the general contractor. Construction began in 2011 and finished in 2013. The tower is located in the Westown neighborhood of Milwaukee, Wisconsin. Due to its proximity to the now demolished Bradley Center and new Fiserv Forum, the building has been home to several members of the Milwaukee Bucks.

See also 
 List of tallest buildings in Milwaukee

External links 
 The Moderne Official site

References 

Residential skyscrapers in Milwaukee
Residential buildings completed in 2012